Peristernia striata is a species of sea snail, a marine gastropod mollusk in the family Fasciolariidae, which consists primarily of spindle and tulip snails.

Description

Distribution

References

Fasciolariidae
Gastropods described in 1868